Vadim Mișin (12 March 1945 – 18 October 2016) was a Moldovan general-major of police, and politician, member of Parliament of Moldova between 1998 and 2014, and former president of the Revival Party (2012–2016).

A long-time PCRM member, at 9 June 2012 he left the party together with Oleg Babenco and Tatiana Botnariuc.

Honours

 2005: Order of the Republic (Moldova)

References

External links
Profile on parlament.md

1945 births
2016 deaths
Moldovan MPs 1998–2001
Moldovan MPs 2001–2005
Moldovan MPs 2005–2009
Moldovan MPs 2009–2010
Moldovan MPs 2010–2014
Moldova State University alumni
People from Atyrau Region
Party of Communists of the Republic of Moldova politicians